Lafayette Morehouse is an intentional community conceived in 1968 in Lafayette, California. The lifestyle it practices is often referred to as “Morehouse”. Inspired by its founder Dr. Victor Baranco and his first wife Dr. Suzanne Baranco, and now by his widow Dr. Cynthia Baranco, Morehouse has been a continuous experiment in group living for over 50 years, one of few such communities still in existence from the 1960s.

Residents of Lafayette Morehouse consider themselves to be social researchers studying the nature of pleasurable group living. They believe that group living best fits the nature of humans and can lead to the most enjoyable life. Victor Baranco recognized that to sustain a cohesive group it was imperative to handle communication, sensuality, and decision-making. Those areas became among their topics of research. The group's findings are presented to the public in the form of courses, and the group receives no outside funding that could bias its findings.

Philosophy 

The cornerstone of the "More philosophy" is the concept of perfectionthe belief that people and situations are right the way they are and that perfection includes the potential for change. This includes the viewpoint that individuals are totally responsible for their lives, including thoughts, emotions, and behaviors.

The term "More"  is used in the sense that "if the world is good, then more can only mean better." Residents consider themselves to be "responsible hedonists" with the idea that the best possible life includes concern for the welfare of others and that apparent pleasure at the expense of others is not pleasure.   This viewpoint is expressed in a quote from Dr. Baranco: "Fun is the goal; love is the way."

History 

The community was founded by Dr. Victor Baranco (son of the Oakland jazz pianist Wilbert Baranco), a self-made millionaire who had achieved "the American dream"  but was still looking for more in life. One night in 1966 he deliberately examined his life and concluded that he and everything in the world were perfect and that he was responsible for everything that had happened to him. Based on this realization, in 1968 he conceived of the Morehouse lifestyle as one in which people could live together pleasurably without doing anything they did not want to do, while serving the world unselfishly and profiting by it.

Since its inception, Lafayette Morehouse has conducted extensive research on how a group can live together pleasurably, including groups as small as two, focusing on topics such as lifestyles, communication, couple relationships, and sensuality. While sensuality was only one among many areas of investigation, this was the topic for which the group became best known. Their investigations of female equality and the importance of the clitoris in female orgasm were pioneering in the late 1960s and 1970s, and these findings were sometimes sensationalized in the press. The group gained notoriety for the 1976 public demonstrations of a woman in continuous orgasm for three hours, which it claims were the first known demonstrations of that kind. The group claims to have since trained many people to this standard.

The findings of their social experiments were initially presented as courses under the auspices of the Institute of Human Abilities. In 1977 the State of California adopted laws to encourage and regulate new educational institutions, and More University was created as a DBA of Lafayette Morehouse Inc., a for-profit corporation that had been formed in 1972. More University was authorized to grant bachelor of humanities degrees, master's degrees in communication, as well as doctoral degrees in lifestyles and sensuality, with the faculty drawn from senior members of the group. It completely complied with the California Private Postsecondary Education Act of 1977 as a “State Authorized” university. Although criticized as a “diploma mill,” over a 20-year period it granted degrees to fewer than 90people. In 1997, responding to a change in the law, Lafayette Morehouse declined to pursue recertification of the university under the new rules, and More University was dissolved. No further degrees were granted and the group resumed doing business as Lafayette Morehouse, with much of the same curriculum.

Since Victor Baranco died in 2002, Cynthia Baranco, his widow and constant companion of 27 years, has led the group in continuing its social research, adding new courses to the curriculum and a feminine voice to the group's teaching. On July 14, 2018, the community celebrated its 50th anniversary.

Over the years a substantial number of communal living experiments using Morehouse principles have been conducted. Most of these have been in northern California, but related communities have also been located in New York, Pennsylvania, Georgia, Hawaii, and other states. At this time the primary community is in Lafayette, California on Purson Lane. There is also a Morehouse in Oakland.

Life in the community 

The everyday goal is to live pleasurably with one's friends. The group has found that people who live deliberately and with awareness enjoy more fun relationships, which have tended to endure and deepen intimacy. Residents pursue their individual goals with the support of the group. Residents also share group goals and participate in group activities, such as maintenance of the property, entertaining family and friends, putting on courses, and holiday celebrations.

People have their own money and make contributions to communal expenses, goals, and projects. Some residents have jobs outside of Morehouse.

One group goal is taking care of less fortunate people. Residents are encouraged to include this as an ongoing part of their lives, according to the viewpoint that the best life includes serving the world unselfishly.

According to their website, "There is no label regarding sexual choices that applies across the board for our group. Sexual preference is a personal choice. Some people here are celibate, many are monogamous and some have more than one partner." Residents adhere to a strict sexual health screening program, begun in the late 1970s, to prevent the spread of sexually transmitted infections.

The political expression of the More philosophy is called the one no-vote, a decision-making system in which any participant, regardless of age, gender, time with the community, or any other factor can cast an irrevocable no-vote that stops any proposed new action. This system is meant to encourage open communication and ensure that all voices are heard and considered before moving forward.

Business 

The business of Lafayette Morehouse Inc. relies on word of mouth, without advertising. The courses, in which research findings are presented, are held at various locations and produce income for communally-held goals, communal financial obligations, and ongoing research. Course topics include pleasurable interpersonal relationships, effective communication, alternative lifestyles, jealousy, money, philosophical viewpoints on perfection, and gratifying sensual life. "It is not our goal to have others live as we do, but rather to offer our findings so that our students can use whatever elements they find beneficial. Those situations that all people encounter and must resolve to have happy, fulfilling lives are addressed in these courses."

One source estimates that  had taken at least one Lafayette Morehouse course, and over 1,000 people had lived in a Morehouse and participated in the social research.

Criticisms and controversies 

More University was criticized for not having the faculty and facilities of a conventional university. According to a 1994 article in Heterodoxy magazine, the choice of faculty was criticized as being too insular. An article in The New York Times stated that Morehouse had neither a campus nor a library. The article also described the degrees as "worthless" and listed the school along with correspondence courses, with the implication that the university was a diploma mill.

One widely cited criticism of Victor Baranco and the Morehouse community was in David Felton's book Mindfuckers. The section on Baranco was repackaged from two Rolling Stone magazine articles, and the principle allegation was that he profited excessively by having group members pay to live in houses while renovating them. It was reported that Jann Wenner, the editor of Rolling Stone, said the material on Baranco was written to personally attack Baranco. These allegations against Baranco have not been repeated since 1972.

Many journalists have described Morehouse as a "sex commune" or "sex cult," focusing on the group's sexual research and courses taught on sexual topics.

The group has been criticized for having poor relationships with its neighbors.  Most of these criticisms date to the period (19912000) in which the group opened its doors and provided food and shelter to a large number of homeless people as their guests, using military surplus tents. Neighbors were angered by the influx of unattractive people, and the county sought to enforce zoning codes to end the activity. The group argued it was their right to use their own home to take care of people that were homeless. To mute extensive criticism in the press, the group undertook a lawsuit against the San Francisco Chronicle, which they lost. After a long court battle with Contra Costa County, Lafayette Morehouse was ordered to take down the tents.

Notes

Works 

 , published irregularly from 1969 to 2004

References

Further reading

External links 

 
 
 

1968 establishments in California
Communalism
Cults
Intentional communities in California
Sex education
Sex educators
Sexology